Vilassar de Mar is a municipality in the comarca of the Maresme in Catalonia, Spain. It is situated on the coast between Premià de Mar and Cabrera de Mar, to the north-east of Barcelona. The town is both a tourist centre and a dormitory town for Barcelona, and is also known for its horticulture. The main N-II road and a RENFE railway line run through the town, while a local road connects the municipality with the C-32 autopista at Vilassar de Dalt and Mataró and Barcelona. The famous canned food company DANI is based in Vilassar de Mar coming from a Vilassar family.

Demography

Education

Primary schools
 Escola del Mar 
 Escola els Alocs
 Escola Pérez Sala
 Escola Vaixell Burriac
 Franciscanes Vilassar de Mar (private school)

High schools
 Institut Pere Ribot
 Institut Vilatzara

Notable people
 Àlex Casademunt, singer
 Bad Gyal, singer
 Ona Batlle, footballer
 , singer

References

 Panareda Clopés, Josep Maria; Rios Calvet, Jaume; Rabella Vives, Josep Maria (1989). Guia de Catalunya, Barcelona: Caixa de Catalunya.  (Spanish).  (Catalan).

External links

  
 Government data pages 
Historical heritage

Municipalities in Maresme